The 344th Air Refueling Squadron is a unit of the US Air Force, part of the 22d Air Refueling Wing Air Mobility Command at McConnell Air Force Base, Kansas.  It operates the Boeing KC-46 Pegasus aircraft conducting aerial refueling missions.

History

World War II

Training in the United States

The squadron was first activated at MacDill Field, Florida as one of the original three squadrons assigned to the 98th Bombardment Group. The 344th soon moved to Barksdale Field, Louisiana, where it began to train as a Consolidated B-24 Liberator heavy bomber squadron under Third Air Force.

The squadron's training was short and it deployed to Egypt in July 1942 over the South Atlantic Ferrying Route transiting from Morrison Field, Florida though the Caribbean Sea to Brazil. It made the Atlantic crossing from Brazil to Liberia, then transited east across central Africa to Sudan.  The air echelon of the group reformed with the ground echelon which traveled by the SS Pasteur around the Cape of Good Hope, joining with the air echelon of the squadron, the 343d Bombardment Squadron and group headquarters at St Jean d'Acre Airfield, in Palestine.

Combat in the Middle East
Upon arrival in the Near East, the squadron became part of United States Army Middle East Air Force, which was replaced by Ninth Air Force in November.  It entered combat in August, attacking shipping and harbor installations to cut Axis supply lines to North Africa.  It also bombed airfields and rail transit lines in Sicily and mainland Italy.  The squadron moved forward with Ninth Air Force to airfields in Egypt; Libya and Tunisia supporting the British Eighth Army in the Western Desert Campaign.   Its support of this campaign earned the squadron the Distinguished Unit Citation.

On 1 August 1943, the squadron participated in Operation Tidal Wave, the low-level raid on oil refineries near Ploiești, Romania.  Alerted to the vulnerability of the Ploiești refineries by a June 1942 raid by the HALPRO project, the area around Ploesti had become one of the most heavily defended targets in Europe. The squadron pressed its attack on the Asta Romana Refinery through smoke and fire from bombing by another group's earlier attack and heavy flak defenses. The squadron's actions in this engagement earned it a second Distinguished Unit Citation.

When the forces driving East from Egypt and Libya met up with those moving westward from Algeria and Morocco in Tunisia in September 1943, Ninth Air Force was transferred to England to become the tactical air force for the invasion of the European Continent. The squadron, along with all Army Air Forces units in North Africa became part of Twelfth Air Force.  In November 1943, the squadron moved to Brindisi Airport, Italy, where it became part of Fifteenth Air Force, which assumed control of strategic operations in the Mediterranean Theater of Operations, while Twelfth became a tactical air force.

Strategic operations in Italy
The squadron continued strategic bombardment raids on targets in Occupied France, southern Germany, Czechoslovakia, Hungary, Austria and targets in the Balkans.  These included industrial sites, airfields, harbors and lines of communication.  Although focusing on strategic bombing, the squadron was sometimes diverted to tactical operations, supporting Operation Shingle, the landings at Anzio and the Battle of Monte Cassino.  In the summer of 1944, the squadron supported Operation Dragoon, the invasion of southern France. The unit also assisted the Soviet advance into the Balkans, and supported Yugoslav Partisans and guerillas in neighboring countries.

Return to the United States

Return to the United States
The squadron returned to the United States in May 1945.  Upon arrival it was redesignated as a very heavy Boeing B-29 Superfortress squadron and began training for deployment to the Pacific to conduct strategic bombardment raids on Japan.  In November 1945, the 98th Group was inactivated and the squadron moved to Merced Army Air Field, California, where it was assigned to the 444th Bombardment Group, where it replaced the 678th Bombardment Squadron, which was converted into a reconnaissance unit. The squadron was inactivated at what was now Castle Field in March 1946.

Strategic Air Command

Reactivation

The squadron was reactivated in 1947 as a Strategic Air Command (SAC) Superfortress unit at Spokane Army Air Field, Washington.  The squadron performed strategic bombardment training missions until the outbreak of the Korean War.

Korean War

In the summer of 1950, when the Korean War began, the 19th Bombardment Wing was the only medium bomber unit available for combat in the Pacific.  In August, SAC dispatched the squadron and other elements of the 98th Bombardment Group to Yokota Air Base, Japan to augment FEAF Bomber Command, Provisional.  The group flew its first combat mission on 7 August against marshalling yards near Pyongyang, capital of North Korea. The squadron's missions focused on interdiction of enemy lines of communications, attacking rail lines, bridges and roads. The squadron also flew missions that supported United Nations ground forces.

SAC’s mobilization for the Korean War highlighted that SAC wing commanders were not sufficiently focused on combat operations. Under a plan implemented for most wings in February 1951 and finalized in June 1952, the wing commander focused primarily on the combat units and the maintenance necessary to support combat aircraft by having the combat and maintenance squadrons report directly to the wing and eliminating the intermediate group structures. This reorganization was implemented in April 1951 for the 98th Wing, when wing headquarters moved on paper to Japan, taking over the personnel and functions of the 98th Group, which became a paper organization, and the squadron began operating under wing control.

Starting in January 1952, the threat posed by enemy interceptors forced the squadron to fly only night missions.  The unit flew its last mission, a propaganda leaflet drop, on the last day before the armistice was signed. The squadron remained in combat ready status in Japan until July 1954 when it moved to Lincoln Air Force Base, Nebraska.

Conversion to jet bombers

The squadron disposed of its B-29s to storage at Davis–Monthan Air Force Base, Arizona.  At Lincoln, the squadron was equipped with new Boeing B-47E Stratojets.   it engaged in strategic bombardment training with the B-47 throughout the rest of the 1950s, into the early 1960s.  From November 1955 through January 1966, the squadron deployed to RAF Lakenheath as part of Operation Reflex, standing alert at the forward deployment site.

From 1958, the 344th began to assume an alert posture at its home base, reducing the amount of time spent on alert at overseas bases to meet General Thomas S. Power's initial goal of maintaining one third of SAC’s planes on fifteen minute ground alert, fully fueled and ready for combat to reduce vulnerability to a Soviet missile strike. The alert commitment was increased to half the squadron's aircraft in 1962.

Cuban Missile Crisis
Soon after detection of Soviet missiles in Cuba, on 22 October 1962 the squadron's B-47s dispersed. On 24 October the 343d went to DEFCON 2, placing all its aircraft on alert.  Most dispersal bases were civilian airfields with AF Reserve or Air National Guard units.  The unit's B-47s were configured for execution of the Emergency War Order as soon as possible after dispersing.  On 15 November 1/6 of the squadron's dispersed B-47s were recalled to Lincoln. The remaining B-47s and their supporting tankers were recalled on 24 November. On 27 November SAC returned its bomber units to normal alert posture.

The squadron was inactivated in June 1966 with the phaseout of the B-47 and closure of Lincoln.

Air refueling
The squadron was redesignated the 344th Air Refueling Squadron and reactivated in May 1986 at Seymour Johnson Air Force Base, North Carolina.  The squadron was assigned to SAC's 68th Air Refueling Wing until the implementation of the objective wing organization, which called for one wing to control all units an each base.  The 68th Wing was inactivated and the squadron transferred to the 4th Operations Group as the 4th Wing added the air refueling mission to its fighters.  After the formation of Air Mobility Command (AMC) in 1992, the squadron moved to McConnell Air Force Base, Kansas and became part of AMC's 22d Operations Group.

On 25 January 2019, McConnell received the first two (15-46009 and 17-46031) of a planned 36 KC-46 Pegasus aircraft that will eventually replace the KC-135 as the primary Air Force tanker aircraft. June 4, 2019 the 334th performed the first KC-46 Pegasus IOT&E (initial operations testing and evaluation) flight, refueling two F-16 Fighting Falcon aircraft four times with around 29,000lb of fuel.

Lineage
 Constituted as the 344th Bombardment Squadron (Heavy) on 28 January 1942
 Activated on 3 February 1942
 Redesignated 344th Bombardment Squadron, Heavy on 1 July 1943
 Redesignated 344th Bombardment Squadron, Very Heavy on 23 May 1945
 Inactivated on 27 March 1946
 Activated on 1 July 1947
 Redesignated 344th Bombardment Squadron, Medium on 28 May 1948
 Discontinued and inactivated, on 25 June 1966
 Redesignated 344th Air Refueling Squadron, Heavy on 7 May 1986
 Activated on 1 October 1986
 Redesignated 344th Air Refueling Squadron on 1 July 1992

Assignments
 98th Bombardment Group, 3 February 1942
 444th Bombardment Group, 10 November 1945 – 27 March 1946
 98th Bombardment Group, 1 July 1947
 98th Bombardment Wing, 16 June 1952
 98th Strategic Aerospace Wing, 1 February 1964 – 25 June 1966
 68th Air Refueling Wing, 1 October 1986
 4th Operations Group, 22 April 1991
 22d Operations Group, 29 April 1994 – Present

Stations

 MacDill Field, Florida, 3 February 1942
 Barksdale Field, Louisiana, c. 9 February 1942
 Page Field, Florida, 30 March 1942
 Drane Field, Florida, 17 May 1942 – 3 July 1942
 RAF Ramat David, British Palestine, 25 July 1942
 St Jean d'Acre Airfield, Palestine, 21 August 1942
 RAF Kabrit, Egypt, 11 November 1942
 Lete Airfield, Libya, 4 March 1943
 Hergla Airfield, Tunisia, 24 September 1943
 Brindisi Airport, Italy, 18 November 1943
 Manduria Airfield, Italy, 19 December 1943
 Lecce Airfield, Italy, 18 January 1944 – 19 April 1945
 Fairmont Army Air Field, Nebraska, 8 May 1945
 McCook Army Airfield, Nebraska, 25 June 1945
 Merced Army Air Field (later Castle Field), California, 10 November 1945 – 27 March 1946
 Andrews Field, Maryland, 1 July 1947
 Spokane Army Air Field (later, Spokane Air Force Base; Fairchild Air Force Base), Washington, 24 September 1947 (deployed to Kadena Air Base, Okinawa, 22 August–7 December 1948; RAF Sculthorpe, England, 25 May – 29 August 1949)
 Yokota Air Base, Japan, c. 5 August 1950 – 22 July 1954 (deployed until 14 August 1953, then permanently stationed)
 Lincoln Air Force Base, Nebraska, 24 July 1954 – 25 June 1966 (deployed to RAF Lakenheath, England, 12 November 1955 – 28 January 1956)
 Seymour Johnson Air Force Base, North Carolina, 1 October 1986
 McConnell Air Force Base, Kansas, 29 April 1994 – present

Aircraft

 Consolidated B-24 Liberator, 1942–1945
 Boeing B-29 Superfortress, 1945, 1947–1954
 Boeing B-47 Stratojet, 1954–1966
 McDonnell Douglas KC-10 Extender, 1986–1993
 Boeing KC-135 Stratotanker, 1994 – 2017
 Boeing KC-46 Pegasus 2017 – present

References

 Notes

 Citations

Bibliography

External links
AFHRA 344th Air Refueling Squadron History

Air refueling squadrons of the United States Air Force
Military units and formations in Kansas
Units and formations of Strategic Air Command